Mary French may refer to:

 Mary Billings French, heiress and society figure
 Mary French Rockefeller,  American heiress, socialite and philanthropist
 Mary French (attorney), American attorney
 May French Sheldon, née Mary French, American author and explorer
 Mary Mel French, United States Chief of Protocol